Megachile pluto, also known as Wallace's giant bee or , is a large resin bee found in Indonesia. With a wingspan of  it is the largest known living bee species. It was believed to be extinct until several specimens were discovered in 1981. No further sightings were confirmed until two specimens were collected and sold on eBay in 2018. A live female was found and filmed for the first time in 2019.

Description

Wallace's giant bee is a black resin bee with well-developed, large jaws. Only females have large jaws. M. pluto is believed to be the largest living bee species, and remains the largest extant bee species described. It is "as long as an adult's thumb". Wallace's giant bee is easily distinguished from other bees due to its large size and jaws, but also a notable white band on the abdomen.

Distribution and habitat
The reports of Wallace's giant bee's existence come only from three islands of the North Moluccas in Indonesia: Bacan, Halmahera, and Tidore. Very little is known about its distribution and habitat requirements, although it is thought to be restricted to primary lowland forests. The islands have become home to oil palm plantations that now occupy much of the former native habitat. This has caused the International Union for Conservation of Nature  to label this species as vulnerable.

Discovery and rediscovery
The species was originally collected by Alfred Russel Wallace in 1858, and given the common name "Wallace's giant bee"; it is also known as the "giant mason bee". It was thought to be extinct until it was rediscovered in 1981 by Adam C. Messer, an American entomologist, who found six nests on the island of Bacan and other nearby islands. The bee is among the 25 "most wanted" lost species that are the focus of Global Wildlife Conservation's "Search for Lost Species" initiative.

The bee had not been spotted for over 37 years. In 2018, two specimens were collected in Indonesia, one on Bacan in February and the other on Halmahera in September. They were subsequently sold on eBay, highlighting the lack of protection that is afforded to the rare species. In 2019, a single female was found by Clay Bolt, living in a termite nest in Indonesia. This specimen was filmed and photographed before being released.

Ecology
Wallace's giant bees build communal nests inside active nests of the tree-dwelling termite Microcerotermes amboinensis, which may serve to hide their existence from attackers. The bee uses tree resin to build compartments inside the termite nest, which protects its galleries. Female bees repeatedly leave their nests to forage for resin, frequently gathered from Anisoptera thurifera. The bee's large jaws assist in resin gathering; the female makes large balls of resin, which are held between the jaws. The association of the bee with the termite may be obligate.

See also 
 List of largest insects

References

External links 

pluto
Endemic fauna of Indonesia
Insects of Indonesia
Hymenoptera of Asia
Vulnerable fauna of Asia
Insects described in 1860